Maikel Chang Ramírez (born April 18, 1991) is a Cuban professional footballer who plays for Major League Soccer club Real Salt Lake.

Club career
Born in Havana, Chang played for local clubs Industriales and Ciudad de la Habana, before leaving the country and joining Charleston Battery in 2013. He moved to USL side Real Monarchs for the 2018 season.

Maikel Chang became the first player in the league’s modern era to reach 30 career assists. Chang arrived at the Monarchs after four seasons with the Charleston Battery where he played 7,981 minutes and scored 15 goals in 109 matches played.

Additionally, Chang scored 15 goals - two of them in the final playoffs - and assisted his teammates eight times.

On 18 November 2019, the Cuban reached the title of champion after defeating Louisville City in the grand final.

On 21 November 2019, Chang moved up to MLS with Real Salt Lake.

International career
He made his international debut for Cuba in a February 2012 friendly match against Jamaica and has earned a total of three caps, scoring no goals.

He defected to the United States in October 2012 having traveled to Toronto with the Cuba national team to face Canada in a World Cup qualifying game.

Honours
Real Monarchs
USL Cup: 2019

References

External links

1991 births
Living people
Sportspeople from Havana
Cuban people of Chinese descent
Defecting Cuban footballers
Association football midfielders
Cuban footballers
Cuba international footballers
Cuba youth international footballers
Footballers at the 2011 Pan American Games
Pan American Games competitors for Cuba
FC Industriales players
FC Ciudad de La Habana players
Charleston Battery players
Real Monarchs players
Real Salt Lake players
Cuban expatriate footballers
Cuban expatriate sportspeople in the United States
Expatriate soccer players in the United States
Sportspeople of Chinese descent
USL Championship players
Major League Soccer players